(John) Derek (Risdon) Hayward, OBE (13 December 1923 – 26 April 2010) was Archdeacon of Middlesex from 1974 until 1975.

Perry was educated at Stowe. After wartime service with the 27th Lancers he was managing director of Hayward Waldie & Co. in Calcutta. He then studied at Trinity College, Cambridge and Westcott House, Cambridge ; and was ordained in 1957. After a curacy at St Mary, Bramall Lane, Sheffield he was Vicar of St Silas, Sheffield from 1959 to 1963; Vicar of Isleworth from 1964 to 1994; General Secretary of the Diocese of London from 1975 to 1993; and a member of the General Synod of the Church of England from 1975 to 1990.

Notes

1923 births
People educated at Stowe School
Alumni of Trinity College, Cambridge
Alumni of Westcott House, Cambridge
Archdeacons of Middlesex
2010 deaths
27th Lancers officers
Officers of the Order of the British Empire
Members of the General Synod of the Church of England